The Division II Women's College World Series (WCWS) is the final portion of the NCAA Division II Softball Championship for college softball teams in Division II in the United States.

Softball was one of twelve women's sports added to the NCAA championship program for the 1981-82 school year, as the NCAA engaged in battle with the AIAW for sole governance of women's collegiate sports. The AIAW continued to conduct its established championship program in the same twelve (and other) sports; however, after a year of dual women's championships, the NCAA conquered the AIAW and usurped its authority and membership.

Rogers State are the reigning national champions, winning their first national title in 2022.

Champions
The champion was Augustana for 2019.
See Association for Intercollegiate Athletics for Women Champions for the AIAW Division II and III softball champions from 1980 to 1982.  NOTE: In 1982, in all three divisions, there were both NCAA and AIAW champions.

Summary
The teams that have won the most national championships since 1982 are:

 Schools highlight in yellow have reclassified athletics from NCAA Division II.

See also 
 College softball
 NCAA Division I softball tournament
 NCAA Division III Softball Championship
 AIAW Intercollegiate Women's Softball Champions
 NAIA Softball Championship

References

External links
 NCAA Division II softball webpage

Recurring sporting events established in 1982
Softball
Champion
NCAA Softball Championship